Branislav Škripek (born 30 August 1970) is a Slovak politician. He served as a Member of the National Council (2012–2014) and the European Parliament (2014–2019).

Early life 
Škripek was born in Piešťany. He studied Catholic Theology at the Comenius University. Following his graduation, he started a Charismatic community in Bratislava, which has included the prime minister Eduard Heger. In addition, Škripek translated Christian literature and edited a Christian magazine.

Politics 
In the 2012 Slovak parliamentary election Škripek became an MP for the populist movement Ordinary People and Independent Personalities (OĽaNO). He gained media notoriety for scolding fellow MPs for being rude to each other and attempting to ban depictions of nudity in the media. In 2014 European Parliament election in Slovakia, Škripek gained the sole OĽaNO mandate by preferential votes. In the EP, he was a member of the European Christian Political Movement and a part of the European Conservatives and Reformists group.

In the 2019 European Parliament election in Slovakia, Škripek was not included on the OĽaNO list due to his conflict with the party leader Igor Matovič. Subsequently he joined another snubbed former MEP, Anna Záborská and co-founded a new party called Christian Union.

Although the Christian Union failed to pass the representation threshold in the European Elections, it beat expectations by receiving over 3% of the vote as a new party with limited notability and resources. In spite of Škripek's opposition, Christian Union leaders other than himself ran in the 2020 Slovak parliamentary election on the OĽaNO list.

Personal life 
Škripek is married to a fellow Charismatic Christian Andrea. They have two sons together. In addition, before his marriage Škripek adopted a disabled five year old orphan Marcel. Marcel died at the age of twenty two.

References 

1970 births
Living people
People from Piešťany
Anti-abortion activists
MEPs for Slovakia 2014–2019
OĽaNO politicians
Members of the National Council (Slovakia) 2012-2016
Comenius University alumni
Slovak Roman Catholics
Converts to Christianity from atheism or agnosticism